Bhavani Fonseka is a constitutional lawyer and a prominent human rights lawyer and activist in Sri Lanka. She is a researcher and  Attorney at Law in the Centre for Policy Alternatives. She is a member of the policy committee of Human Rights Watch. She was an advisor to the Consultation Task-force on human Rights and member to formulate the National Human Rights Action Plan in Sri Lanka. She is counsel in cases in the Supreme Court of Sri Lanka. She did her bachelor's degree in law from the University of Bristol and her masters in law from the Denver University and masters in public administration from Harvard University.

Fonseka was a Mason Fellow at the Harvard Kennedy School for the period 2013-2014. In 2015 she was selected to participate in the 2nd Women's Leadership Program Eisenhower Fellows.

References 

Sri Lankan human rights activists
Sri Lankan women activists
Sri Lankan women lawyers
Living people
Year of birth missing (living people)
Alumni of the University of Bristol
University of Denver alumni
Harvard Kennedy School alumni
21st-century Sri Lankan lawyers
Eisenhower Fellows